Cairo Aviation was charter airline based in Cairo, Egypt.

History 

Cairo Aviation is a charter company operating Tupolev Tu-204-120 passenger aircraft and Tu-204-120C all-cargo aircraft on a dry lease basis from Sirocco Aerospace International.

Beside domestic routes in Egypt, the company mainly operated on international routes to various destinations in Europe, Africa and the Middle East. Furthermore, Cairo Aviation operated scheduled flights for the national carrier Egypt Air on many occasions.

Being a sister company to Sirocco Aerospace international, Cairo Aviation was a test vehicle for the Tu-204-120 aircraft when it first entered service. Sirocco was testing many aspects of projected- versus actual operating costs; dispatch reliability; noise and emissions levels; and component wear and tear among many other things. Satisfied with the results, Sirocco began aggressive sales and marketing efforts for its aircraft.

Destinations
In July 2017, Cairo Aviation operated the following scheduled routes:

Egypt
 Cairo - Cairo International Airport

Saudi Arabia
 Jeddah - King Abdulaziz International Airport
 Yanbu - Yanbu Airport

Fleet

Current fleet
The Cairo Aviation fleet consisted of the following aircraft in August 2018:

Former fleet
The airline operated 1 further Tupolev Tu-204-120 (at August 2017).

References

External links

Defunct airlines of Egypt
Airlines established in 1998
Airlines disestablished in 2018
Companies based in Cairo
Defunct charter airlines
Egyptian companies established in 1998